Conrad Fritz Hoffmann (born 9 November 1987 in Worcester, Western Cape) is a South African rugby union player, who most recently played with the . His regular position is scrum-half.

Career

Youth

In 2005, he represented  at the Under-18 Craven Week competition. He progressed through their age groups, representing them at Under-19 level in 2006 and at Under-21 level in 2007.

He was also included in the South Africa Under-19 squad for the 2006 Under 19 Rugby World Championship.

Western Province / Stormers

He made a total of five appearances during that competition, making his first start in the match against , also scoring a try in that match.

He made three starts and three substitute appearances during that competition.

In 2008, he made yet another step up by being included in the  squad for the 2008 Super 14 season. However, he missed the rest of the season due to injury.

He returned to action during the 2009 Vodacom Cup, making six appearances in that competition.

He made four more appearances during the 2009 Currie Cup Premier Division, as well as 21 appearances during the 2010 Vodacom Cup and Currie Cup competitions.

He also made four appearances for university side  during the 2010 Varsity Cup tournament, ending second in the points scoring charts with 75 points.

Sharks

However, he dropped out of the Super Rugby squad in 2012, making just four substitute appearances during the 2012 Vodacom Cup competition and was an unused substitute once during the 2012 Currie Cup Premier Division.

Hamiltons

He returned to Cape Town to play for club side Hamiltons. He helped the team finish runners-up in the 2013 Western Province Super League A, which assured their qualification to the 2014 SARU Community Cup. He was named in 's wider training group prior to the 2013 Currie Cup Premier Division season, but failed to make an appearance for them. A proposed spell at  also failed to materialise.

Brumbies

Along with fellow South African Lionel Cronjé, he then joined Canberra-based side  on a two-year deal prior to the 2014 Super Rugby season. However, his stay in Canberra only lasted one season and he left after the 2014 season, having made just 4 appearances.

Return to Sharks

He returned to South Africa, rejoining the  prior to the 2014 Currie Cup Premier Division.

References

1987 births
South African rugby union players
Sharks (rugby union) players
Sharks (Currie Cup) players
Stormers players
Western Province (rugby union) players
Rugby union scrum-halves
Rugby union players from Worcester, South Africa
Afrikaner people
Living people
Hamilton RFC, Sea Point players
ACT Brumbies players
Expatriate rugby union players in Australia
South African expatriates in Australia
Alumni of Paarl Boys' High School